Amara ambulans is a species of beetle in the family Carabidae. It is found in Eastern Europe (Ukraine, Russia) and in Asia.

References

ambulans
Beetles of Asia
Beetles of Europe
Beetles described in 1832